A122 may refer to:
 A122 road (England), an unused designation
 A122 road (Malaysia), a road in Perak connecting Kampung Masjid Baharu and Kampung Changkat Petai
 RFA Olwen (A122), a 1964 fast fleet tanker of the Royal Fleet Auxiliary